S46 may refer to:

Submarines 
 , of the Royal Navy
 , of the Indian Navy
 , of the United States Navy

Other uses 
 S46 (Berlin), a line of the Berlin S-Bahn
 S46 (New York City bus), serving Staten Island
 Blériot-SPAD S.46, a French biplane airliner
 Explorer S-46 (satellite), a failed American spacecraft
 GER Class S46, a British steam locomotive
 Parti Melayu Semangat 46, a defunct political party in Malaysia
 S46: If swallowed, seek medical advice immediately and show this container or label, a safety phrase
 SABCA S-46, a Belgian aircraft
 Sulfur-46, an isotope of sulfur